Yufka may refer to:

 Yufka, or Filo, the very thin sheets of dough used in making börek
 Yufka, or Saj bread, a kind of large, thin unleavened flatbread